Gordon Matthew Singer (born June 25, 1984) is a former professional Canadian football offensive lineman. He was drafted by the Montreal Alouettes in the second round of the 2009 CFL Draft. He played CIS football for the Manitoba Bisons. The Alouettes announced his retirement on June 24, 2009.

References

External links
Montreal Alouettes bio

1984 births
Living people
Canadian football people from Calgary
Canadian football offensive linemen
Players of Canadian football from Alberta
Manitoba Bisons football players
Montreal Alouettes players